The Romanian Journal of Physics is a peer-reviewed open access scientific journal covering physics. It is published by the Editura Academiei Române. The journal was established in 1956 as the Revue de physique and renamed Revue Roumaine de physique in 1964, obtaining its current title in 1994. The editor-in-chief is Aureliu Emil Săndulescu.

Abstracting and indexing
The journal is abstracted and indexed in the Science Citation Index Expanded and Scopus.

References

External links

Open access journals
English-language journals
Physics journals
Publications established in 1964
Romanian Academy